CFIF-FM is a Canadian radio station, which broadcasts at 101.1 FM in Iroquois Falls, Ontario. The station airs an adult contemporary format branded as Moose FM.

The station was launched in 1998 by Tri-Tel Communications as CJWL-FM 104.9, and moved to its current frequency in 2000. In 2003, CJWL and its sister station CHPB-FM in Cochrane were purchased by their owner, Haliburton Broadcasting Group.

Haliburton changed the station's callsign to CFIF-FM in 2005, enabling Evanov Radio Group to take over the old callsign for its own new CJWL-FM in Ottawa.

On April 23, 2012 Vista Broadcast Group, which owns a number of radio stations in western Canada, announced a deal to acquire Haliburton Broadcasting, in cooperation with Westerkirk Capital. The transaction was approved by the CRTC on October 19, 2012.

Current operation status of CFIF is unknown. It is believed that CFIF is a rebroadcaster of CHPB-FM.

References

External links

 

Fif
Fif
Fif
Radio stations established in 1998
1998 establishments in Ontario